Ossipee Lake is located in Carroll County in eastern New Hampshire, in the communities of Ossipee and Freedom. At , it is the sixth-largest lake located entirely in New Hampshire. The lake is fed by the West Branch (entering from the north), the Bearcamp and Lovell rivers (entering from the west), and the Pine River (from the south). Water leaves the eastern end of the lake via the Ossipee River, flowing to the Saco River in Maine.

Ossipee Lake is a popular vacation site. The land surrounding the lake is home to numerous condo, cabin, and lake house developments.  As in most lakes regions, some buildings are available for vacation rentals, and many of the developments have private beaches.

The lake is classified as a cold- and warmwater fishery, with observed species including rainbow trout, lake trout, land-locked salmon, smallmouth and largemouth bass, chain pickerel, yellow perch, white perch, sunfish, and brown bullhead.

See also

List of lakes in New Hampshire

References

Lakes of Carroll County, New Hampshire
New Hampshire placenames of Native American origin